Novokopylovo is a rural locality (a selo) and the administrative center of Novokopylovsky Selsoviet, Zarinsky District, Altai Krai, Russia. The population was 840 as of 2013. There are 8 streets.

Geography 
Novokopylovo is located 19 km southwest of Zarinsk (the district's administrative centre) by road. Smirnovo is the nearest rural locality.

References 

Rural localities in Zarinsky District